Double Coin is a Chinese manufacturer of radial tires for trucks. It is headquartered in Shanghai and is majority owned by Shanghai Huayi. Double Coin also makes Warrior brand car and light truck tires in a joint venture with Michelin. The North American subsidiary is China Manufacturers Alliance, LLC (CMA).

References

External links
 https://web.archive.org/web/20120814094449/http://www.doublecoinholdings.com/en/index.aspx
 http://www.doublecoin-us.com/

Tire manufacturers of China
Chinese brands
Manufacturing companies based in Shanghai